Edwin Dolby was an English Victorian architect who practised in Abingdon. His works include the design of Abingdon School.

Career

According to census records Dolby was born in Sutton Bonington, Nottinghamshire. By 1869 he working from 2 Bedwell Place, East St Helen Street, Abingdon, then in Berkshire.

His known works span the period 1863–88.
Dolby altered, rebuilt or restored a number of Anglican parish churches. Many of them were in the Vale of White Horse (then part of Berkshire) and Oxfordshire, but he also rebuilt two churches in Pembrokeshire. Drawings for one of the latter, at Castlebythe, were published in the Church Builder in 1867.
In 1869–70 he built Abingdon School, described in The Builder as "of a simple character, the local material of red brick and tile being the chief material employed, relieved by bands of Bath stone".

In 1877–78 Dolby worked with the architect H.J. Tollit of Oxford, rebuilding the parish churches at Watlington and Crowell, both in Oxfordshire. After his partnership with Dolby, Tollit designed Thame Town Hall in 1888, a building for Littlemore Hospital in 1902 and a factory for Morris Motors in Longwall Street, Oxford in 1910.

Work

Eagles Close Almshouses, Wantage, 1867.
Claydon House, Claydon, Oxfordshire: alterations, 1867.
St Peter's parish church, Headley, Hampshire, 1867–68.
Abingdon Grammar School, Abingdon, Berkshire (now Oxfordshire), 1869–70.
St John the Baptist's church, Lynmouth, Devon, 1871.
St Michael's parish Church, Castlebythe, Pembrokeshire: rebuilding, 1875 (demolished). 
St David's parish Church, Llanychaer, Pembrokeshire: rebuilding, 1876
St Giles' parish church, Medbourne, Leicestershire, chancel, 1876.
St Leonard's parish church, Watlington, Oxfordshire: rebuilding (with H.J. Tollit), 1877.
St Mary's parish church, Crowell, Oxfordshire: rebuilding (with H.J. Tollit), 1878.
St. Michael's parish church, Sutton Bonington, Nottinghamshire: restoration including complete rebuilding of the chancel and porch, 1878.
St Peter's parish church, Drayton, Cherwell: restoration and new vestry, 1878.
St Peter's parish church, Drayton, Vale of White Horse: south porch, 1879.
St Nicolas' parish church, Abingdon: restoration, 1880.
St Luke's parish church, Garford, Oxfordshire: rebuilding, 1880.
Abingdon School, Abingdon, Berkshire (now Oxfordshire): extension and bell turret, 1880.
St Edmund's parish church, Swanton Novers, Norfolk: north aisle and chancel, 1881.
St John the Baptist parish church, Kingston Bagpuize, Oxfordshire: added apse and made alterations, 1882.
Mortuary Chapel at Hatfield Cemetery, Doncaster, Yorkshire, 1883.

Dolby was also one of the architects of the Albert Park housing estate in Abingdon, along with Dolby's pupil John George Timothy West (1860–1931) and his son Archibald Buller West (1885–1957).

References

Sources

1838 births
1900 deaths
19th-century English architects
Architects from Berkshire
English ecclesiastical architects
Gothic Revival architects
People from Sutton Bonington